The Newport Aquarium is an aquarium located in Newport, Kentucky, United States at Newport on the Levee, across the river from Cincinnati. It is the first aquarium to have success in breeding shark rays. It also hosts a collection of alligators, including albino alligators and Mighty Mike (left in 2018).

Newport Aquarium is an accredited member of the Association of Zoos and Aquariums. The aquarium has many outreach programs, including the mobile shark cart and the WAVE Foundation, that seek to promote STEM and educate the public about oceans. Throughout the year, the aquarium holds seasonal events to engage the public and promote ocean conservation.

The Newport Aquarium is part of Herschend Family Entertainment, a for-profit company.

Exhibits

Gator Alley is home to the pair of albino American alligator, as well as many other reptiles.

Amazon includes arapaima, pacu, redtail catfish, silver arowana, black arowana, long-tailed river stingray, and perch.

Shark Central lets visitors pet the many species of sharks including lesser guitarfish, pyjama shark, Port Jackson shark, leopard shark, small-spotted catshark, crested bullhead shark, spotted gully shark (sharptooth houndshark).

Kroger Penguin Palooza includes king penguin, Inca tern, chinstrap penguin, gentoo penguin, macaroni penguin and rockhopper penguin.

Ring of Fire is a gallery which focuses on certain species that visitors requested to come back the most. This gallery features giant pacific octopus, Japanese spider crab, moon jellyfish, longspine snipefish, and pinecone fish.

Frog Bog includes green tree frog, American bullfrog, African clawed frog, red-eyed tree frog, gray tree frog, cane toad, tomato frog, and other frog and toad species.

Dangerous and Deadly includes Gila monster, red lionfish, pinecone fish, electric eel, Gaboon viper, spotted wobbegong, stonefish, redeye piranha, whitespotted bamboo shark, tentacled snake, white-blotched river stingray and a cottonmouth (water moccasin).

Seahorses: Unbridled Fun includes six-line wrasse, splendid garden eel, spotted garden-eel, Barbour's seahorse, many-banded pipefish, trumpetfish, whitespotted surgeonfish, opossum pipefish, longspine snipefish, big-bellied seahorse, ribboned sea dragon, razorfish, dwarf seahorse, flame angelfish, Hawaiian reef lobster, and a group of paddlefish.

Surrounded by Sharks includes bowmouth guitarfish (shark ray), sand tiger shark, sandbar shark, scalloped hammerhead shark, whitetip reef shark, blacktip reef shark, nurse shark, zebra shark, southern stingray, Nassau grouper, giant grouper, reticulate whipray also known as the honeycomb stingray, and Denver the loggerhead sea turtle.

Coral Reef includes honeycomb moray, unicorn fish, cownose ray, blue tang, powderblue tang, yellow tang, humphead wrasse and bonnethead.

Shark Ray breeding program 
The shark ray breeding program is one of the first of its kind, with two sharks, Sweet Pea and Scooter, producing offspring. However, the process is difficult due to the tendencies of shark rays to have "rough sex", which caused one of the new females, at the time, to be killed. The aquarium has a total of four adult shark rays on exhibit today and scientists have been able to learn more about their reproductive behaviors and gestation periods, which is being used to better care for them.

Outreach programs 
Mobile Shark Cart is a mobile cart that is used as an education/touch pool that is taken to schools, events, etc. and is used to bring awareness to shark protection and ocean conservation.

WAVE program is a program that promotes the importance of ocean conservation, leadership, and STEM (Science, Technology, Engineering, Math) to young children through young adults. Individuals can go behind the scenes with a staff member and see how the aquarium works and learn about the conservation programs and species at the aquarium.

Seasonal events 
Mermaid's Cove is an interactive event, in which guests get to see and talk to mermaids throughout the aquarium. Locations includes Shark Ray Bay Theater and Coral Reef tank. The mermaids advocate for ocean conservation and teach kids ways to save the planet. This event is normally scheduled during September.

Scuba Santa arrives at the aquarium starting at the end of November through January 1 each year, excluding Christmas Day. He can be seen in the shark tank with his elves.

Albino alligators 
Albino alligators, Snowflake and Snowball, returned to Newport in 2014 and have permanent residency. They are about six feet long and weigh between 65 and 85 pounds. There are fewer than 100 albino alligators known in the world today, and this is due to poor blending in with their natural environment and their sensitivity to UV rays.

Mighty Mike 
Mighty Mike, the 14 foot and 800 pound American alligator, left the aquarium in September 2018. He was the biggest alligator outside of Florida. He returned to his home, Florida's Crocodilian Conservation Center, after being on loan to Newport Aquarium for five years. Furthermore, he was housed in Alligator Alley at the aquarium. He is an ambassador for his species and helps to promote conservation of wetland ecosystems.

Gallery

References

External links
Shark Ray Presentation

Aquaria in Kentucky
Buildings and structures in Campbell County, Kentucky
Tourist attractions in Campbell County, Kentucky
Newport, Kentucky
Herschend Family Entertainment
1999 establishments in Kentucky
Zoos established in 1999